Toby Walker may refer to:

Toby Walker (musician) who worked with Bob Fass 
Toby Walker, character in Annie Oakley (1935 film)